"Wildflowers" is a song written by Dolly Parton, which was included on the Grammy-winning, multi-Platinum 1987 album Trio and recorded by Parton with Emmylou Harris and Linda Ronstadt.  The original recording featured an autoharp, acoustic guitar (played by Harris) and fiddle, and was arranged to sound like an old fashioned Appalachian folk song.  It was the fourth single released from the Trio album, and reached #6 on the Billboard Hot Country Singles & Tracks chart in July 1988.

In 2008, the recording was played at a reception by the Texas State Democratic Party, honoring former First Lady Lady Bird Johnson. Johnson's love of wild flowers was well known, and she had long championed the planting of them along the U.S. highways.

Content
In the song, the narrator talks about being restless and wanting to branch out, using wildflowers as a metaphor, concluding that "wildflowers don't care where they grow".

Chart positions

References

External links
Wildflowers lyrics at Dolly Parton On-Line

1988 singles
Dolly Parton songs
Linda Ronstadt songs
Emmylou Harris songs
Songs written by Dolly Parton
Warner Records singles
1986 songs
Songs about flowers